Ned's Atomic Dustbin are an English rock band formed in Stourbridge, West Midlands, in November 1987. The band took their name from an episode of radio comedy programme The Goon Show. The band is unusual for using two bass-players in their line-up: Alex Griffin plays melody lines high up on one bass, and Matt Cheslin plays the regular bass lines on the other. This gives the band a tense and highly driven sub-hardcore sound featuring distorted effects-laden guitar and energetic drums.

The band was formed at sixth-form college and they recorded their first album while some members were still teenagers. This led to a strong teenaged fanbase with a reputation for enjoying crowd-surfing and moshing at their gigs. The band was also noted (and occasionally ridiculed) for their early image, which consisted of uniformly crimped hair and a predilection for sporting shorts and band or skateboard T-shirts. "The Neds" (as their fans referred to them) were well known for their own distinctive T-shirts, reportedly producing over 86 different designs within three years (1987–1990). In 2009, Jonn Penney stated, "We're still adding designs - old habits die hard".

History
Frontman and co-founder Jonn Penney has listed Joni Mitchell, Echo & the Bunnymen, The Cure and The Teardrop Explodes among his favourite artists. His favourite albums include Closing Time by Tom Waits and Architecture & Morality by Orchestral Manoeuvres in the Dark (OMD). Ned's Atomic Dustbin quickly gathered a strong fanbase after being offered a support slot by local heroes The Wonder Stuff on their 1989 and 1990 UK tours. During 1990, Ned's Atomic Dustbin signed with Birmingham-based indie label Chapter 22 Records for their debut release, The Ingredients EP, followed by a single, "Kill Your Television", which reached No. 92 and No. 53 respectively in the UK singles chart. "Kill Your Television" also topped the UK independent singles chart. This, combined with their acclaimed live reputation, drew a huge crowd to their afternoon appearance on the main stage of the Reading Festival in August 1990. The buzz created was significant enough to catalyse the interest of major record labels. One final single for Chapter 22 followed, "Until You Find Out", but distribution problems meant that many fans were left unable to purchase copies, thus stunting its chart progress. It eventually stalled at No. 51. Frustrated, the band finally decided to sign to Sony Records, on the proviso that they be allowed to release their music through their own Furtive label - thus regaining a higher degree of creative control while still enjoying the benefit of the major label's distribution and advertising clout.

In March 1991, Ned's Atomic Dustbin found themselves in the UK top 20 with their next single, "Happy", their Sony/Furtive debut. It reached No. 16 and earned the band the first of two Top of the Pops appearances. They released their debut album God Fodder shortly afterwards, in April 1991, which made No. 4 in the UK top 40 albums chart. In July 1991, British music magazine NME noted that the band were, along with The KLF, Seal, The La's and Electronic, making their mark in the United States. The band released a new UK single, "Trust", towards the end of 1991, while America got the God Fodder versions of "Kill Your Television" and "Grey Cell Green", the video for the latter track proving to be a big hit on MTV's taste-making alternative show 120 Minutes. During 1991, the group toured around the world with, amongst others, Mega City Four, Senseless Things and Jesus Jones. They recorded their second album Are You Normal? in 1992, which was promoted by the singles "Not Sleeping Around", "Intact" and, in some European territories, "Walking Through Syrup".

Having headlined the NME stage at the Glastonbury Festival in 1992, the band spent the next couple of years on a worldwide tour, releasing a compilation of older non-album material and two new tracks called "0.522" in 1994 before decamping to Wales to record their final album, Brainbloodvolume. While still retaining the band's trademark melodic sensibilities, this album boasted a heavier, more diverse sound than their previous releases, moving away from the distinctive twin bass set-up to incorporate samplers and keyboards. Sony released the album in America before the UK, meaning that most die-hard fans bought it on import. This damaged its UK chart position when it was eventually released domestically, increasing tensions between the band and their label.

Ned's Atomic Dustbin had one last UK top 40 single with "All I Ask of Myself Is That I Hold Together" in 1995, following a final appearance on The Word, while the uncharacteristically slow number, "Stuck", became the band's final single, making the BBC Radio One B-list.  In 1995, after an extensive US tour to support Brainbloodvolume, Ned's Atomic Dustbin split up in New York City following what would be their final show.

Singer Penney formed a new band, Groundswell (initially featuring Ned's Atomic Dustbin guitarist, Rat), who recorded one single, "Corrode", and a studio album Plausible/Infeasible for New Jersey-based indie label, Gig Records. They disbanded shortly thereafter - in fact, the album was only actually released after their demise.

One reviewer writes, "At the time of their inception, there was no other band like Ned’s Atomic Dustbin. To this very day, there still isn’t. No matter how many up-and-coming acts from England, or even America, have tried to fine-tune their sound to resemble that of Ned’s, it still falls utterly short of perfection."

Ned's Atomic Dustbin took the stage in 2000 for the first time since their initial breakup for a show in Dudley with Groundswell members Andy King and Martin Warlow taking the place of Mat Cheslin and Rat.  Originally billed as "the last 30 minutes of Ned's Atomic Dustbin," it was intended as an opportunity to say a proper goodbye to British fans who never got to see a final Ned's show.  However, the resounding success convinced members of the band to continue working together, and they continue to perform sporadically ever since.  2004 saw the band perform two new songs, "Hibernation" and "Ambush". In 2005 they again played a few late-December gigs, and on 5 June 2006 their first new single in 11 years, "Hibernation", was released, supported with a weekend concert series called "Ned-Fest". The single was available as both a download and a CD, available to buy online via their website.

The video game NCAA Football 2006 for PlayStation 2 and Xbox features the song "Kill Your Television". Their song "Grey Cell Green" is featured in the video game Saints Row for the Xbox 360 platform, on "The Rock" radio station. The Neds' cover version of the Bay City Rollers song "Saturday Night" features in the movie So I Married an Axe Murderer.

On 7 May 2007, a compilation album was released with the name of Some Furtive Years - A Ned's Anthology: "Furtive" is a reference to their earlier record label. Unlike the others, this compilation features liner notes by Penney and Cheslin, offering insight into the background of songs featured on the album.

Reunited

On 12 May 2008, the band announced that the original line-up would be performing live together for the first time since 1995, for a gig in London at The Astoria. When asked about performing together for the first time in over a decade, Penney stated, "It just felt right! There was the understandable awkwardness when we stood in a room together for the first time in 13 years, but that just melted away as soon as we started to play the songs." "We didn't really know what was going to happen once we got playing on stage, because it had been such a long time since we'd all been in it together. It's different from rehearsal. It was such an incredible kind of electric feeling atmosphere for everybody. You felt at one with the crowd again, similar to very early on, when everybody was excited about what was happening." Matt Cheslin says, "It was great, it's been quite nostalgic. I haven't played for the whole time that I haven't been in the band, but some of the really old songs I remember more. You do really notice the difference in the really early songs. It was as exciting as it was when I was 17."

Of the reunion shows, Penney said: "The reunion shows have gone down well and the fans gave us a massive welcome back so we wanted to do something different for them and play the album that made it happen for us. It was a time that was exciting for us and the fans, it is not an anniversary as such, we just wanted to celebrate that album and era."

Penney spoke of the loyalty of Ned's Atomic Dustbin fans in a 2009 interview. "We see masses of familiar faces every time we play - we were always pretty familiar with our audiences anyway and we're very lucky that so many of them are so loyal to us. People still fly in to shows from all over the world - Japan, Australia, Canada, U.S. and all over Europe. It's incredibly humbling to see these people keep coming back."

When asked whether Ned's Atomic Dustbin are planning on recording any new material together, Penney replied, "I think we will, but don't hold your breath – songwriting is a slow process for Ned's."

The band has continued to play event-style gigs with other 1990s indie bands, such as the Nedstock shows in Leeds, Birmingham and London with Republica and Cud in November 2013. On 24 May 2014, Ned's Atomic Dustbin headlined the Gigantic Classic Indie All-Dayer in Manchester, with The Wedding Present, Cud, The Frank and Walters and The Sultans of Ping FC. In 2014 Ned's Atomic Dustbin also joined a host of '90s indie stars to play the first Mute Elephant Promotions 'Indie Daze' festival on 13 September, at The Forum in Kentish Town.

Ned's Acoustic Dustbin
Encouraged by Miles Hunt to perform some songs acoustically, Ned's Acoustic Dustbin was born in 2017. Featuring Jonn and Rat, the duo released the album Ned's Acoustic Dustbin in 2019 which featured versions of such tracks as "Intact" and "All I Ask of Myself Is That I Hold Together" without drums or bass. The duo toured in support of the release.

Members
 Classic lineup 1989–1995, 2008–present:
 Jonn Penney - vocals
 Gareth "Rat" Pring - guitars, keyboards
 Alex Griffin - bass, guitars, keyboards, backing vocals
 Matt "Mat" Cheslin - bass
 Dan Worton - drums
 Reformation-era members, 2000–2008:
 Martin Warlow - guitar
 Andy King - bass
 Other members:
 Tracey - vocals
Wiz - guitar
Floyd - guitar

Discography

Furtive was the band's own label distributed under Sony, which allowed the band to retain a level of independence and control (although which subsidiary of Sony distributed each release depended on which one and where it was bought. In the UK it was Sony Soho Square, Japan Epic, and in the US they were shifted about - first Columbia, then Chaos, then Work.)

Albums

Singles and EPs

Video and DVD

References

External links
 

English rock music groups
English alternative rock groups
Stourbridge
Musical groups established in 1987
Musical groups from West Midlands (county)
Columbia Records artists
Sony Music artists